Montenegro participated at the 2018 Summer Youth Olympics in Buenos Aires, Argentina from 6 October to 18 October 2018.

Competitors

Karate

Montenegro was given a quota by the tripartite committee to compete in karate.

Boys

Shooting

Montenegro was given a quota by the tripartite committee to compete in shooting.

Individual

Team

References

2018 in Montenegrin sport
Nations at the 2018 Summer Youth Olympics
Montenegro at the Youth Olympics